Coreopsis nuecensis, the crown tickseed, is a North American plant species of Coreopsis in the family Asteraceae. It is native to Texas, Louisiana, and probably Tamaulipas. There are reports of isolated populations in Michigan and Florida, both probably escapes from cultivation.

Coreopsis nuecensis is an annual herb up to 50 cm (20 inches) tall. Ray florets are yellow with red or purple flecks; disc florets are yellow.  The species grows in sandy soil in open woodlands.

References

nuecensis
Flora of North America
Plants described in 1836